Wakamiyama Kōhei (born 16 April 1943 as Toshihiko Kumano) is a former sumo wrestler from Toyama City, Japan. He made his professional debut in November 1957, and reached the top division in January 1964. His highest rank was sekiwake. He retired in November 1969.

Career record
The Nagoya tournament was first held in 1958.

See also
Glossary of sumo terms
List of past sumo wrestlers
List of sumo tournament second division champions
List of sekiwake

References

1943 births
Living people
Japanese sumo wrestlers
Sumo people from Toyama Prefecture
Sekiwake